This is a list of international rugby union players who died serving in armed forces during the First World War. Most of these came from the British Commonwealth, but a number of French international rugby players were also killed.
Also, none of the Central Powers had true national rugby squads at this point although there had been rugby clubs in Germany since the late 19th century, and the German Rugby Federation is the oldest national rugby union in continental Europe. However, Germany did put forward a team for rugby union at the 1900 Summer Olympics (although not the 1908 tournament, which involved only two sides) – Olympic rugby was not seen as particularly prestigious – and it is not known if any of that team were war casualties.

The war took an extremely heavy toll upon rugby at all levels, and this list includes some major figures, such as Dave Gallaher, who led a major All Blacks tour to the British Isles in 1905; David Bedell-Sivright, who is sometimes considered one of the greatest Scottish players of all time; and Ronnie Poulton-Palmer who is similarly honoured by the English; and the Frenchman Jean Bouin, better known as a middle distance runner at the 1908 Olympics as well as the 1912 Games.

The first rugby international to die in World War I was France and Stade Toulousain scrum-half Alfred Mayssonnié on 6 September 1914.

List by country

Australia

Although many rugby players were killed during the war, a large number were also injured or crippled, leading to their departure from the game.

 Harold Wesley George, died on 10 May 1915, Aged 28.
 Bryan Desmond Hughes MC, died on 6 August 1918, Aged 32
 Hubert A Jones, died on 9 July 1918, Aged 28.
 Edward Larkin, died on 25 April 1915, Aged 34
 George Pugh, died on 5 September 1916, Aged 26 
 Blair Swannell, killed in action on 25 April 1915, Aged 39
 William Tasker, died on 9 August 1918, Aged 26.
 Fred Thompson, killed in action on 29 May 1915, Aged 25.
 Jack Verge, died on 8 September 1915, Aged 35.
 Clarrie Wallach MC, died on 22 April 1918, Aged 28.

England

One of the most poignant stories is of Ronnie Poulton-Palmer, who had played against the South African tourists of 1912–13 only a few years before:

"Those who watched [Ronnie Poulton] play were certain that he was the greatest three-quarter ever to play the game and they held to that opinion all their lives..."

"Poulton later inherited a fortune on condition that he changed his name to Poulton-Palmer; sadly he did not live to enjoy it, being killed by a sniper's bullet in the Great War. His last words before he died were: 'I shall never play at Twickenham again.'"

England had over twenty six players killed in the conflict. This was the second highest number of casualties, after . However, many of the Scotland players were "Anglos", i.e. based, born or playing in the England's domestic leagues for teams such as London Scottish FC or universities, so their loss affected English rugby too.

Henry Brougham is sometimes listed, because he died of war wounds. However, since he died in 1923, after the war had ended, he is also often omitted.

 Harry Alexander; died on 17 October 1915 Aged 35 
 Henry Berry; died on 9 May 1915, Aged 32.
 Arthur James Dingle; died on 22 August 1915, Aged 23
 George Eric Burroughs Dobbs, died on 17 June 1917, Aged 32.
 Leonard Haigh, died on 6 August 1916 Aged 29.
 Reginald Harry Myburgh Hands, ("Reggie Hands") died on 20 April 1918, Aged 29 Hands was a South African who played cricket for South Africa and rugby for England.
 Arthur Leyland Harrison VC; died on 23 April 1918, Aged 32
 Harold Augustus Hodges; died on 24 March 1918, Aged 32
 Rupert Edward Inglis; died on 18 September 1916, Aged 53
 Percy Dale Kendall; died on 21 January 1915, Aged 34
 John Abbott King; died on 9 August 1916, Aged 32
 Ronald Owen Lagden; died on 3 March 1915, Aged 26
 Douglas Lambert; died on 13 October 1915, Aged 32
 Alfred Frederick Maynard; died on 13 November 1916, Aged 22
 Edgar Roberts Mobbs, ("Mobbsy") died on 29 July 1917, Aged 37
 William Moore Bell Nanson; died on 4 June 1915, Aged 34
 Francis Eckley Oakeley; died on 25 November 1914, Aged 23
 Robert Pillman; died on 9 July 1916, Aged 23
 Ronald William Poulton-Palmer, ("Ronnie Poulton") died on 5 May 1915, Aged 25
 John Edward Raphael, died on 11 June 1917, Aged 35
 Reginald Oscar Schwarz MC, ("Reggie Schwarz") died on 18 November 1918, Aged 43
 Lancelot Andrew Noel Slocock; died on 9 August 1918, Aged 29
 Francis Nathaniel Tarr; died on 18 July 1915, Aged 27
 Alexander Findlater Todd, died on 21 April 1915, Aged 41
 James Henry Digby Watson; died on 15 October 1914, Aged 24.
 Charles Edward Wilson; died 17 September 1914, Aged 43. 
 Arthur James Wilson, died on 1 July 1917, Aged 29

France
France is different from all the other nations mentioned on this list for two reasons – firstly, it was not part of the British Commonwealth nor English speaking, and secondly, unlike the other nations, it actually had a military front in its border territory.

Maurice Boyau particularly distinguished himself as a balloon buster and military flying ace, with 35 victories under his belt. He spent much of his flying career with Escadrille 77, known as "Les Sportifs" for the great number of athletes in its ranks. He had been captain of the French team before the war.

Stade Bordelais of Bordeaux was badly affected, losing players such as Boyau and Giacardy.

 Marie Jean-Baptiste Joseph Anduran ("Joé Anduran"); died on 2 October 1914, Aged 32
 René Emile Henri Boudreaux; died on 8 September 1915, Aged 34.
 Maurice Jean-Paul Boyau (Médaille militaire, Légion d'honneur); died on 16 September 1918, Aged 30
 Marcel Henry Burgun; died on 2 September 1916, Aged 26.
 Jean-Jacques Conilh de Beyssac; died on 13 June 1918, Aged 28.
 Paul Decamps; died on 27 June 1915, Aged 31.
 Julien Dufau; died in December 1916, Aged 28.
 Paul Dupré; died on 15 May 1915, Aged 27.
 Albert Eutrope; died on 26 May 1915, Aged 27.
 Marc Giacardy; died on 20 August 1917, Aged 26
 Pierre Guillemin; died on 9 October 1915, Aged 27 
 Maurice Hedembaigt; died on 5 August 1918, Aged 37.
 Emmanuel Iguinitz; died on 20 September 1914, Aged 24
 Daniel Ihingoué; died on 16 April 1917, Aged 28
 Henri Isaac; died on 20 June 1917 Aged 34
 Henri André Lacassagne; died on 11 November 1916, Aged 30
 Gaston Lane; died on 23 September 1914, Aged 31
 Jean Larribau; died on 31 December 1916, Aged 27
 Marcel Legrain; died on 27 June 1915, Aged 21.
 Alfred Mayssonnié ("Maysso"); died on 6 September 1914, aged 30
 François Poeydebasque; died on 21 December 1914, Aged 23
 Albert Chateau; died from wounds on 15 July 1924, aged 31

German Empire

A German team competed at the 1900 Olympic tournament, represented by players from the SC 1880 Frankfurt club. It is not known if any of those 15 players died in the First World War.

British Isles

British Isles team
Pre-World War I, it was not uncommon for members of the British Isles team (later known as the British and Irish Lions) to be uncapped for their nation of origin. This never happens now.

 Charlie Adamson (English), died on 17 September 1918, Aged 43.
 Sidney Nelson Crowther (English), died on 18 October 1914, Aged 39
 Noel Forbes Humphreys MC (Welsh), died 27 March 1918, Aged 27
 Ron Rogers (English), capped for British Isles in 1904, died Gallipoli 1915, aged 32.
Most British Isles players had been capped for their country, and can be found listed more fully under their respective countries. Capped players include the following.

 : Blair Swannell
 : John Raphael, Alexander Todd
 : Robertson Smyth
 : David Bedell-Sivright, Eric Milroy
 : Phil Waller

Olympians
At least one competitor for the Great Britain Olympic team which competed at rugby union at the 1908 Summer Olympics, and gained silver died –
 Arthur Wilson, died 1 July 1917 (see also England)

Scotland and Ireland did not put teams up for either the 1900 or 1908 Olympic rugby events, and most of the players were from England, and in particular Cornwall.

Ireland
Ireland, unlike Great Britain and much of the British Empire did not have conscription during the war, although there was a disastrous attempt in 1918 to impose it. See also Ireland and World War I.

New Zealand
Thirteen former New Zealand representativesknown as All Blackslost their lives in the First World War, with three (possibly four) of them dying in the Battle of Messines.
 James Alexander Steenson Baird ("Jim Baird"), died on 7 June 1917 in France (probably at Messines), aged 23
 Robert Stanley Black ("Bobby Black"), died on 21 September 1916 at the Somme, aged 23
 Henry Dewar ("Norkey Dewar"), died on 9 August 1915 at Gallipoli, aged 33
 Ernest Henry Dodd ("Ernie Dodd"), died on 11 September 1918 at Havrincourt, aged 38
 Albert Joseph Downing ("Doolan Downing"), died on 8 August 1915 at Gallipoli, aged 28
 David Gallaher ("Dave Gallaher"), died on 4 October 1917 at Passchendaele, aged 43
 Eric Tristram Harper, died on 30 April 1918 in Palestine, aged 40
 James McNeece ("Jim McNeece"), died on 21 June 1917 at Rouen, aged 31
 Alexander James Ridland ("Jimmy Ridland"), died on 5 November 1918 in France, aged 36
 George Maurice Victor Sellars, died on 7 June 1917 at Messines, aged 31
 Reginald Taylor ("Reg Taylor"), died on 20 June 1917 at Messines, aged 28
 Hubert Sydney Turtill ("Jum" Turtill), died on 9 April 1918 in France, aged 38
 Frank Reginald Wilson, died on 19 September 1916 at the Somme, aged 31

Scotland

According to Allan Massie, "Scotland had suffered more severely than any of the Home Countries from the slaughter of the war. Thirty capped players were lost (twenty six English internationalists were killed)."

While some of these players were clearly retired, such as Charles Reid (who had been capped in the 1870s and 1880s), others such as Frederick Harding Turner, James Huggan and John George Will had played in the last match before the war, the Calcutta Cup match in March, 1914, and so had their playing careers prematurely ended. Walter Sutherland was also considered one of Hawick RFC's greatest players, and was still remembered fondly as "Wattie Suddie" in Bill McLaren's playing days.  Few surviving Scots were capped before and after the war – Charlie Usher, Jock Wemyss and Alex Angus are some of the exceptions. Charlie Usher spent much of the war in a POW camp.

 Cecil Halliday Abercrombie, died on 31 May 1916 Aged 30
 David McLaren Bain, died on 3 June 1915, Aged 24
 David Bedell-Sivright ("Darkie Bedell-Sivright"), died on 5 September 1915, Aged 35
 Patrick Charles Bentley Blair, died on 6 July 1915 Aged 24.
 John Argentine Campbell, died on 1 December 1917, Aged 40.
 William Campbell Church, died on 28 June 1915, Aged 32.
 Walter Michael Dickson, died on 26 September 1915, Aged 30.
 John Henry Dods, died on 31 December 1915, Aged 40
 Walter Torrie Forrest, died on 19 April 1917, Aged 36
 Rowland Fraser, died on 1 July 1916, Aged 26.
 William Elphinstone Gordon, died on 30 August 1918, Aged 25
 James Young Milne Henderson, died on 31 July 1917, Aged 26
 David Dickie Howie ("Dave Howie"), died on 19 January 1916, Aged 27
 James Laidlaw Huggan, died on 16 September 1914, Aged 25
 William Ramsay Hutchison, died on 22 March 1918, Aged 29
 George A.W. Lamond, died on 25 February 1918, Aged 39
 Eric Milroy, ("Puss Milroy") died on 18 July 1916 Aged 28.
 Thomas Arthur Nelson, died on 9 April 1917, Aged 40
 James Pearson, died on 22 May 1915, Aged 26
 Lewis Robertson, died on 3 November 1914, Aged 31
 James Ross, died on 31 October 1914, Aged 34
 Andrew Ross, died on 6 April 1916, Aged 36
 Ronald Francis Simson, died on 14 September 1914, Aged 24
 Stephen Sebastian Leonard Steyn, died on 8 December 1917, Aged 28
 Walter Riddell Sutherland ("Wattie Suddie"), died on 4 October 1918, Aged 27
 Frederick Harding Turner, died on 10 January 1915, Aged 26
 Albert Luvian Wade, died on 28 April 1917, Aged 32.
 William Middleton Wallace, died on 22 August 1915, Aged 22
 John George Will, died on 25 March 1917, Aged 24
 John Skinner Wilson, died on 31 May 1916, Aged 32
 Eric Templeton Young, died on 28 June 1915, Aged 23

South Africa
Adam Burdett was part of the 1906-7 tour to the British Isles. This was the inaugural  tour and is recognised as the event that coined the word "Springboks" as a nickname for the South Africa team. Likewise, Toby Moll would probably have rubbed shoulders with Eric Milroy, Noel Humphreys or Phil Waller in the 1910 British Isles tour of South Africa.

Wales

Amongst the fatalities was Richard Garnons Williams, who had played in the very first Wales international rugby union match in 1881. At 59 years of age, he was the eldest of the 13 Wales international players to be killed during the war.

Charles Taylor was the first Welsh fatality, and was a noted athlete, especially good at the pole vault.

Fred Perrett is often left out of lists of the Welsh international war dead due to his supposed defection to the professional game.

United States
The captain of the All America side that faced New Zealand in California died in the war.
Deke Gard, died on 29 September 1918.

Deaths after the war
Reginald Lloyd (Wales, 4 matches 1913–14) died in Bradford on 20 February 1919 three weeks after his discharge from the Army Service Corps. He already had a cough which developed into influenza and death was from pneumonia and cardiac arrest. The doctor who attended him wrote 'my opinion is that this condition was undoubtedly brought about by his service in the army.' He taught at Bradford Grammar School from January 1912, had played for Oxford University, Pontypool and London Welsh, and he had been selected to represent Yorkshire against New Zealand on 8 March 1919. 
Sometimes included are two deaths from war wounds after the war, although both are past the Commonwealth War Graves Commission limit of 31 Aug 1921 (when an order in council declared the war over) to be considered a war death:
Henry Brougham (England) died 18 February 1923 
Hopkin Maddock (Wales) died 15 December 1921

See also
 List of Olympians killed in World War I

References

Bibliography
 Bath, Richard (ed.) The Scotland Rugby Miscellany (Vision Sports Publishing Ltd, 2007 )
 Guttman, Jon & Dempsey, Harry (2002). Spad XII/XIII Aces of World War I (Aircraft of the Aces). Osprey Publishing.
 
 
 Richards, Huw A Game for Hooligans: The History of Rugby Union (Mainstream Publishing, Edinburgh, 2007)

 
 Starmer-Smith, Nigel (ed) Rugby – A Way of Life, An Illustrated History of Rugby (Lennard Books, 1986 )

Online resources
 Commonwealth War Graves database
 

 
 
Rugby Union Players
World War I